Vyacheslav (Viacheslav) Kostyantynovych Prokopovych (1881, Kiev – 1942, Bessancourt) was a Ukrainian politician and historian.

Starting in 1905, he was a politician of the Ukrainian Democratic-Radical Party (UDRP), established in Kiev. At the end of World War I, he was a member of the Ukrainian Party of Socialists-Federalists (UPSF) and Central Rada. In 1918, he served as the minister of education in a cabinet of Ukrainian People's Republic (UNR), headed by Vsevolod Holubovych. On 26 May 1920, Viacheslav Prokopovych became the prime minister of the UNR until 14 October 1920.

At the beginning of 1921 the government went into exile.  The cabinet was headed twice by Prokopovych (March – August 1921, and May 1926 – October 1939). In 1925–1939, he was also a founder and chief editor of Tryzub, published in Paris.

References

1881 births
1942 deaths
Politicians from Kyiv
People from Kievsky Uyezd
Ukrainian people in the Russian Empire
20th-century Ukrainian historians
Ukrainian Democratic Party (1904) politicians
20th-century Ukrainian politicians
Prime ministers of the Ukrainian People's Republic
Members of the Ukrainian government in exile
Ukrainian emigrants to France